Victor Samuel Leyva (born December 18, 1977) is a Mexican former guard in American football. He was drafted in the fifth round of the 2001 NFL Draft by the Cincinnati Bengals. Levya's NFL career started in 2002 and ended in 2005 after playing for three years. He played college football at Arizona State, where he earned first-team All-Pac-10 honors as a senior in 2000.

Leyva played for the Miami Dolphins and New England Patriots in 2005 before retiring.

References

External links
 New England Patriots bio

1977 births
Living people
Sportspeople from Guanajuato
Mexican players of American football
American football offensive guards
Arizona Wildcats football players
Cincinnati Bengals players
Miami Dolphins players
New England Patriots players
People from Porterville, California
Sportspeople from Tulare County, California